James Hawkes (December 13, 1776 Petersham, Worcester County, Massachusetts – October 2, 1865 Rochester, Monroe County, New York) was an American politician from New York.

Life
He moved with his parents to Richfield, New York in 1789. He attended the common schools, taught school in Richfield and later in Burlington. Hawkes returned to Richfield, and was Sheriff of Otsego County from 1815 to 1819. He was a member of the New York State Assembly in 1820.

Hawkes was elected as a Democratic-Republican to the Seventeenth United States Congress, holding office from December 3, 1821, to March 3, 1823.

He was buried at the Mount Hope Cemetery, Rochester.

References

The New York Civil List compiled by Franklin Benjamin Hough (pages 71, 196, 280 and 404; Weed, Parsons and Co., 1858) [gives "Hawks" as surname except at Congress list]

1776 births
1865 deaths
People from Petersham, Massachusetts
Burials at Mount Hope Cemetery (Rochester)
Sheriffs of Otsego County, New York
People from Richfield, New York
Members of the New York State Assembly
Democratic-Republican Party members of the United States House of Representatives from New York (state)